Calder Abbey in Cumbria was a Savigniac monastery founded in 1134 by Ranulph de Gernon, 2nd Earl of Chester, and moved to this site following a refoundation in 1142. It became Cistercian in 1148. It is near the village of Calderbridge.

History 
Ranulf de Gernon (also known as Ranulph le Meschines) founded the abbey on 10 January 1134, and gave a site and a mill to the monks. It was a wooden building and occupied by twelve Savigniac monks from Furness Abbey under the abbot Gerold.

Only four years later, in the midst of the political instability following the death of Henry I, David King of Scots sent Scottish raiders under William Fitz Duncan to raid the northern English counties. Calder Abbey was one of the victims, and the Scots raided they despoiled the Abbey and drove out the monks. This, and the poor endowment, led the monks to abandon the site, and they sought sanctuary at Furness Abbey. However, as Abbot Gerold would not resign his abbacy, a dispute arose and they were obliged to leave. They started a wandering life, first to Hood near Thirsk, then to Old Byland, near Rievaulx Abbey, and finally to Stocking where they finally settled and built the great Byland Abbey. However, the monks were worried that Furness would continue to exercise control, and after Gerold travelled to Sauvigny in France to put his case, they were released from the jurisdiction of Furness in 1142.

Meanwhile, back at Calder, a second attempt at colonisation was made from Furness in about 1142 under Abbot Hardred, and this time they had the protection of Fitz Duncan. The Sauvigniac order became Cistercian in 1148 when the two orders were amalgamated, and Calder likewise was obliged to follow.

By 1180 a stone church had been built of which the west door is the main survivor today. Most of the rest of building was rebuilt in 1220 in the early English style by Thomas de Multon of Egremont.

The house was not rich, in 1535 the annual net income was only £50. At the Dissolution, the only recorded relic in the monastery's possession was that of a girdle (a belt) claimed to have belonged to the Virgin Mary.

In 1535 an unfavourable report was made against the abbey and its community by the King's commissioners (though their views are often suspected to be biased and dubiously motivated).

The abbey was surrendered in 1536 by the last abbot, Richard Ponsonby.

Post-dissolution 
At the Dissolution Henry VIII gave the abbey to Sir Thomas Leigh, who pulled off the roof and sold it and anything else he could and reduced the church to a ruin. Ownership passed through many secular hands, in which it still remains.

Much of the cloister buildings remain either incorporated into Calder Abbey House, now a largely early-nineteenth century structure that is still a private residence, or in adjoining ruins, such as the chapter house. It is now a picturesque ruin, no doubt retained by early residents of the newly formed mansion as an ornamental feature. The Abbey and grounds are private, and not open to the public, and new trees obscure much of the view from the surrounding land.

Modern celebration
In 1934 the 800th anniversary of the foundation was celebrated by a mass held in the ruined abbey. Over 2,000 people attended a celebration led by Dr Thomas Wulstan Pearson, OSB, the Roman Catholic Bishop of Lancaster.

The Monk's Bridge
The Monk's Bridge, as it is still called, on Cold Fell, built by the monks of Calder, is the oldest packhorse bridge in Cumbria; it spans the River Calder, just upstream of the confluence with Friar Gill. Also known as "Matty Benn's bridge", this is still in use today and is open to the public.

Notes

See also

Grade I listed buildings in Cumbria
Listed buildings in St. Bridget Beckermet
List of monastic houses in Cumbria
List of monastic houses in England

References 
 Parker C A, The Gosforth District - its places of interest and antiquities. pub Titus Wilson 1904
 Houses of Cistercian monks: The abbey of Calder, A History of the County of Cumberland: Volume 2 (1905), pp. 174–78.
 Anthony New. 'A Guide to the Abbeys of England And Wales', p99-102. Constable.
 Butler & Given-Wilson, The medieval monasteries of Great Britain, 1979,

External links
 Calder Abbey at cistercians.shef.ac.uk

Monasteries in Cumbria
Cistercian monasteries in England
1135 establishments in England
1536 disestablishments in England
Religious organizations established in the 1130s
Grade I listed buildings in Cumbria
Grade I listed monasteries
Christian monasteries established in the 12th century
Ruins in Cumbria
Ruined abbeys and monasteries